James Robison (born October 9, 1943) is an American televangelist and the founder and President of the Christian relief organization Life Outreach International.

Biography

Early life and ministry
Robison was born and raised in Pasadena, Texas; a city outside of Houston. Robison's mother, Myra Wattinger, was 40 years old at the time she gave birth to him. Robison has revealed that he was the product of rape and that his mother placed an ad in the Houston newspaper for a Christian couple to take care of him.

H.D. Hale, a local area pastor, and his wife answered the ad and took Robison in, after which he became a born again Christian at one of Hale's church services at the age of 14. He has talked often about his childhood, about the strained relationship with his biological father, who was an alcoholic, and whom he would wind up confronting in a violent manner at the age of 15. Robison eventually met his wife, Betty Freeman, while a student at Pasadena High School, and they wed on February 23, 1963, when both were 19.

Two years later, in 1965, the couple graduated with honors from Middle Tennessee State University. The couple, who now host the daily television program LIFE Today, started their ministry together in late 1965 and then went into full-time television ministry, through the Rev. Dr. Billy Graham, in 1968. James and Betty have three children and 11 grandchildren, and reside in Fort Worth, where their program LIFE Today and their ministry LIFE Outreach are based. They lost their daughter Robin to throat cancer in late 2012.

Dominionism
In 1979, Robison lost his regular slot on WFAA-TV in Dallas for preaching a sermon calling homosexuality a sin. He had already made a name for himself when he called "for God's people to come out of the closet" and take back the nation. In response, Robison organized a "Freedom Rally" at the Dallas Convention Center that attracted 10,000 people. According to Mike Huckabee, who was Robison's communications director at the time, that rally was the genesis of the organization Moral Majority.

Robison eventually rose to become one of the more prominent and popular conservative religious leaders in politics during the early 1980s. Some suggested he could, in time, inherit the vaunted mantle held by Reverend Graham. However, in the mid-1980s, Robison abruptly withdrew from his political activities. He instead began focusing on his own church community, on church unity, and on seeking forgiveness.

By his own admission, his demanding schedule had consumed him, and the popularity he had so quickly achieved, together with an increasing desire for more such admiration, had changed him into someone he no longer recognized and did not like. This opinion was held doubly by his wife, Betty.  Around this time he changed his religious views from evangelicalism to the charismatic movement, leaving the Southern Baptist Convention in the process

He with his Betty are members of Gateway Church, the DFW megachurch pastored by Robert Morris.

Recently, however, Robison has become active in social conservative circles once again. In 2010, he convened a meeting in Dallas with several prominent conservative religious leaders, including Richard Land and Tony Perkins, in order to make plans to replace Barack Obama with a more socially conservative president in 2012.

LIFE Today TV program
The Robisons' TV program, the daily television program LIFE Today, airs around the world on various television networks, both secular and Christian, such as Trinity Broadcasting Network, and Daystar. It can also be seen on internet podcasts, as well as the Life Outreach International official website. LIFE Today often features guest interviews, musical guests such as Christian recording artists Sandi Patti, Steven Curtis Chapman, Larnelle Harris, as well as mission outreaches. Past guests have included actor Robert Duvall, singer Randy Travis, US President George W. Bush, baseball pitcher Andy Pettitte and other Christian celebrities.

It also features real stories from various guest viewers; people who are ministry partners, their life stories, how they converted to Christ, and how their faith impacts their lives. The third-world mission outreaches include distributing emergency food, drilling water wells, establishing orphanages, rescuing girls from sex trafficking, providing medical care, and abortion alternatives. James Robison also advocates for the anti-abortion movement and stated on his TV show that he "is the product of his mother's rape and a good life and future is still possible through God regardless of such inconvenient circumstances."

Christian retreat
In 1974, the James Robison Evangelistic Association purchased a hunting and fishing lodge near Hawkins, Texas, which the association developed into Brookhaven Retreat, a not-for-profit Christian camp and retreat center, still in operation today under different management.

Literary works
Since 1962, while he was still in college, Robison has spoken to millions of people—first through crusade evangelism, and now today through television. He has authored more than a dozen books, including True Prosperity, Thank God I'm Free and My Father's Face. His book The Absolutes: Freedom's Only Hope (Tyndale House), Living In Love (Waterbrook Multnomah), Indivisible (Hachette), and "God of All Creation" (Waterbrook Multnomah).

The Stream
In 2015, Robison launched The Stream, based in Fort Worth, Texas, a "national daily where those concerned about our nation's perilous course can gather for news, wisdom and inspiration."

Selected bibliography
The Absolutes: Freedom's Only Hope
True Prosperity
The Soul of a Nation

References

External links 
James Robison's website
Life Outreach
Ambassadors for LIFE
Brookhaven Retreat
Report from the Evangelical Council for Financial Accountability

1943 births
Living people
American television evangelists
People from Pasadena, Texas
Christian revivalists
American anti-abortion activists
Christians from Texas